N-Phenylnaphthalen-1-amine (NPN) is a nonpolar, hydrophobic molecule with the chemical formula . This molecule is most notable for its binding affinity in mouse major urinary protein (MUP). This ligand has the greatest binding affinity of all MUP binding ligand discovered, including 2-sec-butyl-4,5-dihydrothiazole (SBT), 6-hydroxy-6-methyl-3-heptanone (HMH), and 3-isobutyl-2-methoxypyrazine (IBMP). NPN binds 28 times tighter than SBT. It also makes 38 nonpolar contacts to MUP, whereas IBMP only makes 15 contacts which are the next most nonpolar contacts.  There is a slight difference in the binding affinities and forms for NPN bound in wild-type MUP and the Y120F MUP mutant. In wild-type MUP there is just enough room for the amine group of NPN to makes a water mediated hydrogen bond to Tyr120, whereas in Y120F MUP mutant, there is a slight shift and the amine group makes a direct hydrogen bond to Tyr120. Much is still unknown about the entropic and enthalpic effects of the MUP binding site.

References

1-Naphthyl compounds
Phenyl compounds
Secondary amines